Elmar Valiyev (born 3 October 1960 Evlakh, Azerbaijan) is the former mayor of Ganja, Azerbaijan. He graduated from the Azerbaijan Technical University as a mechanical engineer, and later from Azerbaijan State Academy.

On February 18, 2011 Veliyev was appointed mayor of Ganja. On July 3, 2018, Valiyev was seriously wounded in an assassination attempt. It was the first assassination attempt on a government official in Azerbaijan in 25 years. During the investigation of his assassination attempt, it was found out that Tawhid Ibrahim Begli, leader of the Islamic Resistance Movement of Azerbaijan, called for his assassination. He was relieved of his duties by President Ilham Aliyev in August 2018.

References

Mayors of places in Azerbaijan
Politicians from Ganja, Azerbaijan
People from Yevlakh
Azerbaijan Technological University alumni
1960 births
Living people